"Nada Puede Cambiarme" (English:"Nothing Can Change Me") is a song recorded by Mexican singer Paulina Rubio, features Slash from Velvet Revolver (former Guns N' Roses guitarist) on the lead electric guitar. It is the second track on Rubio's eighth studio album, Ananda (2006), which was released on September 19, 2006, by Universal Music. "Nada Puede Cambiarme" was written by Fernando Montesinos, with production from Áureo Baqueiro. It was released as second single from Ananda on January 29, 2007.

Composition
"Nada Puede Cambiarme" is a pop rock tune. Lyrically, the song is an anthem of female empowerment, where the narrator decides to optimistically accept an ended relationship, choosing to celebrate herself and move on, albeit with the faint hope of getting back together with her lover.

Reception

Critical response 
Upon its release, the song received generally positive reviews from critics, especially for Slash's appearance, which they considered "excellent" and "curious". However, several media and fans of the hard rock genre were outraged.In retrospect, the newspaper La Voz de Galicia listed the song in its list of "the strangest musical duets in history," asserting that "no one can explain why the guitarist of a hard rock band agreed to collaborate on a pop song." As well, it was included in the "most surprising duets in music" list of the Mexican edition of the magazine ¡Hola!.

Chart performance 
"Nada Puede Cambiarme" reached number nine on the Spain Digital Singles chart, based solely on digital download sales. On the Airplay chart, the track reached number twenty-nine on the Los 40. Eventually, it was certified gold. In Rubio's native Mexico, it debuted at number twenty-three on 6 January 2007, and reached at number sixteen three weeks later. The song performed better in South America, mainly in Paraguay, where it reached number three on the Radio Latina chart, while in Venezuela it reached number twelve on the Record Report chart.

In the United States, "Nada Puede Cambiarme" debuted on the Billboards chart Hot Latin Songs at number thirty-one on 3 February 2007. Three weeks later, the song reached number twenty-one. It one chart performed better on the Latin Pop Airplay, where the song debuted at number twenty-six, then rising to number six.

Music video

Conception and filming
The accompanying music video was directed by Dago González, who had previously helmed Rubio's "Algo Tienes" clip in 2004, and was produced by Anke Thommen, with whom she first worked. The video was shot on the Mack Sennett Studios in Los Angeles, California on January 9, 2007, with a total filming of 16 hours. It stars Rubio, Guns N' Roses' guitarist, Slash, who collaborated on the guitar solo in the bridge of the song, as well as dancer Daniel "Cloud" Campos. Music video's atmosphere was described as "a fashion show full of glamrock" in which Rubio is "the sexiest and most daring bride," while Slash's appearance was described as energetic "with his guitar intensifying the energy of the most fun and unusual wedding." Slash confessed that it was Rubio who encouraged him to shoot the clip. Although he didn't have high expectations, he finally said that "it was an interesting session. I never thought it would be as big a deal as it was at the time."

Release and reception
The music video debuted on Los 40 Principales and Cuatro° on January 29, 2007. Los 40 Principales official website aired a special material, which included exclusively premiered of the "Making Of" images of the clip, the EPK of Ananda and an interview.

The clip begins with Rubio dressed in a sophisticated fuschia two-piece bridal gown. Traditional wedding bells are heard in the background. Everything changes in a second, and the atmosphere takes on the look of a fashion show with models parading in dark clothes and black eye makeup. Some models play their violins while the others model. Soon, Rubio comes on stage with a bouquet of flowers and an excess of glitter in her eyes. She wins the applause of the audience, but two models try to take her away unsuccessfully. The cameramen begin to capture Rubio's moment and golden papers in the shape of dollars fall from the ceiling. She then appears dancing on a huge golden Gibson Explorer-style guitar that sits atop a fuchsia-toned replica of a cake. During the beginning of the guitar solo, a voice-over interrupts the wedding celebration as a close-up of a shadowy model emulating the wedding priest emerges. "If anyone present knows of any impediment to celebrating this union, let them speak now or forever hold their peace," is heard in voice-over. Then out comes Slash playing his guitar solo while Rubio joins him dancing in front of him and passing under his legs. The clip ends with Rubio throwing the bouquet of flowers and running towards the cake.

Several fans of the rock genre and Guns N' Roses music were outraged when tle music video was released. The Radio Oasis website wrote that "we don't really know what to think of this wedding. Maybe they wanted to create a song, chewy and repetitive like Paulina's usually are, with the presence of Slash and one of his forceful solos, but definitely not possible." In a similar way, the editors of La Gramola Encendida said that the singer plays at being "a Mercadona pre-Lady Gaga" while Slash is "a guitar God who has remained more like a living myth than the magnificent guitarist he is."

 Track listing and formats Digital download "Nada Puede Cambiarme" (Acoustic Version) – 3:30
 "Nada Puede Cambiarme" – 3:38Finland CD Single "Nada Puede Cambiarme" – 3:38Maxi-Single – Remixes "Nada Puede Cambiarme" (Caribbean Nights Remix Edit) – 3:38
 "Nada Puede Cambiarme" (Caribbean Nights Extended Remix) – 6:45
 "Nada Puede Cambiarme" (Pasito Duranguense) – 3:20
 "Nada Puede Cambiarme" (Reggaeton feat. Franco "El Gorilla") – 2:41EP'
 "Nada Puede Cambiarme" – 3:38
 "Nada Puede Cambiarme" (Caribbean Nights Club Edit) – 3:33
 "Nada Puede Cambiarme" (Pasito Duranguense Version) – 3:20
 "Nada Puede Cambiarme" (Acoustic Version) – 3:30

Personnel
The following people contributed to "Nada Puede Cambiarme":
 Paulina Rubio – lead vocals
 Fernando Montesinos — songwriter
 Aureo Baqueiro - production
 Peter Mokran - mixing
 Tom Baker - mastering
 Slash - guitar
 Recorded at Ananda Studios in Di Lido Island, Miami Beach, Florida

Charts

Certifications

Release history

References

2007 singles
2006 songs
Paulina Rubio songs
Song recordings produced by Áureo Baqueiro
Universal Music Latino singles
Spanish-language songs